More than one ship of the French Navy has borne the name Commandant Bory ("Commander Bory"):

 , a destroyer completed in 1913 and stricken in 1926
 , an  commissioned in 1939 and scrapped in 1953
 , a frigate in commission from 1964 to 1996

French Navy ship names